Little Bit… is the second EP by Japanese rock band Wands. The album includes two previously released singles, "Koiseyo Otome" and "Ai wo Kataru yori Kuchizuke wo Kawasou." The album  was released on October 6, 1993 under B-Gram Records label. It reached #2 on the Oricon chart for first week, with 483,350 sold copies. It charted for 20 weeks and sold 951,660 copies.

Track listing

References 

1993 EPs
Wands (band) albums
Being Inc. albums
Japanese-language albums